Right Now is the 1972 album by the pioneer British folk musician Wizz Jones. The album was produced by John Renbourn, who also played sitar and harmonica on the album.

The album was re-released on CD in 1999 on the Columbia label and on vinyl in 2011 by Germany's Speaker's Corner label.

Track listing
"Which of Them You Love the Best"  (Alan Tunbridge) - 5:04
"One Grain of Sand"  (Pete Seeger) - 3:36
"City of the Angels"  (Alan Tunbridge) - 6:06
"The Raven"  (Wizz Jones, Alan Tunbridge) - 3:54
"Right Now"  (Traditional; arranged by Wizz Jones) - 4:04
"Find a Man for You Girl"  (Alan Tunbridge) - 3:40
"American Land"  (Traditional; arranged by Peggy Seeger) - 4:01
"No More Time to Try"  (Wizz Jones) - 2:42
"Mary Go 'Round"  (Alan Tunbridge) - 6:46
"Deep Water"  (Wizz Jones, Alan Tunbridge) - 3:49

Personnel
Wizz Jones - vocals and acoustic guitar
Sandy Jones - banjo
Peter Berryman - acoustic and electric guitar
Reanna Sutcliffe - piano, harpsichord and vocals
Ian Hoyle - drums
Malcolm Pool - bass
John Renbourn - sitar and harmonica
Sue Draheim - fiddle
Andy Fernbach - piano

Production
Producer: John Renbourn for Jo Lustig (Isle of Man) Limited
Recording Engineer: Colin Caldwell
Recorded at: Marquee Studios, London
Photography: Alessandro Visinoni

References

Wizz Jones albums
1972 albums
CBS Records albums